Malta competed at the 2014 Summer Youth Olympics, in Nanjing, China from 16 August to 28 August 2014.

Judo

Malta was given a quota to compete by the tripartite committee.

Individual

Team

Swimming

Malta qualified two swimmers.

Boys

Weightlifting

Malta was given a quota to compete in a girls' event by the tripartite committee.

Girls

References

2014 in Maltese sport
Nations at the 2014 Summer Youth Olympics
Malta at the Youth Olympics